The 33rd European Film Awards was scheduled to be presented in Reykjavík, Iceland on 12 December 2020. Because of the COVID-19 pandemic the Awards took place as a virtual ceremony without an audience, broadcast and streamed from the European Film Academy’s seat, Berlin, on Saturday, 12 December 2020. The European Film Academy (EFA), the Mayor of Reykjavik and the Icelandic Minister of Education, Science and Culture decided to cancel the event in the Icelandic capital in December 2020 and announced that instead the 35th European Film Awards Ceremony will be presented in Reykjavik in December 2022.

Selection

Feature 
The list of feature-length fiction films recommended for a nomination for the 2020 European Film Awards. 

 Adults in the Room - Costa-Gavras (France/Greece)
 Another Round - Thomas Vinterberg (Denmark/Netherlands/Sweden)
 Atlantis - Valentyn Vasyanovich (Ukraine)
 Bad Tales - Damiano D'Innocenzo & Fabio D'Innocenzo (Italy/Switzerland)
 Berlin Alexanderplatz - Burhan Qurbani (Germany/Netherlands)
 Between Heaven and Earth - Najwa Najjar (Palestine/Luxembourg/Iceland)
 Cat in the Wall - Mina Mileva & Vesela Kazakova (Bulgaria/UK/France)
 Charlatan - Agnieszka Holland (Czech Republic/Ireland/Poland/Slovakia)
 Charter - Amanda Kernell (Sweden/Denmark/Norway)
 Corpus Christi - Jan Komasa (Poland/France)
 DAU. Natasha - Ilya Khrzhanovskiy & Jekaterina Oertel (Germany/Ukraine/UK/Russia)
 Delete History - Benoît Delépine & Gustave Kervern (France/Belgium)
 Echo - Rúnar Rúnarsson (Iceland/France)
 Enfant terrible - Oskar Roehler (Germany)
 Falling - Viggo Mortensen (UK/Canada/Denmark)
 Father - Srdan Golubović (Serbia/Germany/France/Croatia/Slovenia/Bosnia and Herzegovina)
 Final Report - István Szabó (Hungary)
 Hidden Away - Giorgio Diritti (Italy)
 Hope - Maria Sødahl (Norway/Sweden)

 Let There Be Light - Marko Škop (Slovakia/Czech Republic)
 Martin Eden - Pietro Marcello (Italy/France)
 Mother - Rodrigo Sorogoyen (Spain/France)
 Motherland - Tomas Vengris (Lithuania/Latvia/Greece/Germany)
 My Little Sister - Stéphanie Chuat & Véronique Reymond (Switzerland)
 Persian Lessons - Vadim Perelman (Russia/Germany/Belarus)
 Servants - Ivan Ostrochovský (Slovakia/Romania/Czech Republic/Ireland)
 Slalom - Charlène Favier (France)
 Summer of 85 - François Ozon (France, Belgium)
 The Big Hit - Emmanuel Courcol (France)
 The Endless Trench - Aitor Arregi, Jon Garaño & Jose Mari Goenaga (Spain/France)
 The Painted Bird - Václav Marhoul (Czech Republic/Ukraine/Slovakia)
 The Personal History of David Copperfield - Armando Iannucci (UK/USA)
 The Platform - Galder Gaztelu-Urrutia (Spain)
 Undine - Christian Petzold (Germany/France)
 Uppercase Print - Radu Jude (Romania)
 Vitalina Varela - Pedro Costa (Portugal)
 Wildland - Jeanette Nordahl (Denmark)
 Willow - Milcho Manchevski (North Macedonia/Hungary/Belgium/Albania)

Documentary 

 Acasă, My Home - Radu Ciorniciuc (Romania/Germany/Finland)
 Collective - Alexander Nanau (Romania/Luxembourg)
 I Am Not Alone - Garin Hovannisian (Armenia)
 Little Girl - Sébastien Lifshitz (France)
 Il varco - Once More Unto the Breach - Federico Ferrone & Michele Manzolini (Italy)
 Saudi Runaway - Susanne Regina Meures (Switzerland)
 Self Portrait - Margreth Olin, Katja Hogset & Espen Wallin (Norway)

 State Funeral - Sergei Loznitsa (Netherlands/Lithuania)
 The Cave - Feras Fayyad (Syria/Denmark/Germany/USA/Qatar)
 The Earth Is Blue as an Orange - Iryna Tsilyk (Ukraine/Lithuania)
 The Euphoria of Being - Réka Szabó (Hungary)
 They Call Me Babu - Sandra Beerends (Netherlands)
 Walchensee Forever - Janna Ji Wonders (Germany)

Short Film 
The European Short Film 2020 is presented in co-operation with the following 24 European film festivals. At each of the festivals, the jury of the international competition appointed by the festival chooses a single candidate (there shall be no ex-aequo candidates). Then the participating festivals nominate five short films from the list of 24 candidates.

 12 - 18 October 2019: International Film Festival of Cyprus - the jury has chosen In Between (dir. Samir Karahoda)
 17 - 27 October 2019: Riga International Film Festival - the jury has chosen Uncle Thomas, Accounting for the Days (dir. Regina Pessoa)
 19 - 26 October 2019: Valladolid International Film Festival - the jury has chosen Flesh (dir. Camila Kater)
 21 - 27 October 2019: Uppsala International Short Film Festival - the jury has chosen Past Perfect (dir. Jorge Jácome) 
 5 - 10 November 2019: Internationale Kurzfilmtage Winterthur - the jury has chosen Community Gardens (dir. Vytautas Katkus) 
 7 - 17 November 2019: Cork Film Festival - the jury has chosen Things That Happen in the Bathroom (dir. Maggie M. Bailey)
 15 November - 1 December 2019: Black Nights Festival / PÖFF Shorts - the jury has chosen 12 K. Marx Street (dir. Irine Jordania) 
 30 November - 7 December 2019: Leuven International Short Film Festival - the jury has chosen Lake of Happiness (dir. Aliaksei Paluyan)
 22 January - 2 February 2020: International Film Festival Rotterdam - the jury has chosen The Bite (dir. Pedro Neves Marques)
 31 January - 8 February 2020: Clermont-Ferrand International Short Film Festival - the jury has chosen Invisible Hero (dir. Cristèle Alves Meira)
 20 February - 1 March 2020: Berlin International Film Festival - the jury has chosen It Wasn't the Right Mountain, Mohammad (dir. Mili Pecherer)
 4 - 8 March 2020: Tampere Film Festival - the jury has chosen Memorable (dir. Bruno Collet)
 1 - 5 April 2020: Go Short - International Short Film Festival Nijmegen - the jury has chosen Sun Dog (dir. Dorian Jespers)
 28 May - 2 June 2020: VIS Vienna Shorts Festival - the jury has chosen The Best City Is No City At All (dir. Christoph Schwarz)
 31 May - 7 June 2020: Krakow Film Festival - the jury has chosen The Golden Buttons (dir. Alex Evstigneev)
 2 - 8 June 2020: Kurzfilm Festival Hamburg - the jury has chosen Genius Loci (dir. Adrien Mérigeau)
 11 - 19 July 2020: Curtas Vila do Conde - International Film Festival - the jury has chosen Nha Mila (dir. Denise Fernandes)
 28 July - 1 August 2020: Motovun Film Festival - the jury has chosen To the Dusty Sea (dir. Héloïse Ferlay)
 5 - 15 August 2020: Locarno Film Festival - the jury has chosen People on Saturday (dir. Jonas Ulrich)
 14 - 21 August 2020: Sarajevo Film Festival - the jury has chosen All Cats Are Grey in the Dark (dir. Lasse Linder)
 24 - 30 August 2020: OFF - Odense International Film Festival - the jury has chosen Nina (dir. Hristo Simeonov)
 2 - 12 September 2020: Venice Film Festival - the jury has chosen The Shift (dir. Laura Carreira)
 20 - 26 September 2020: International Short Film Festival In Drama - the jury has chosen Favourites (dir. Martin Monk)
 22 - 27 September 2020: Encounters Film Festival - the jury has chosen The Tiger Who Came to Tea (dir. Robin Shaw)

Awards voted by EFA Members 
Nomination has been announced on 10 November 2020.

Feature

Best Film

European Comedy 
The nominees were announced on 27 October 2020. The nominations were determined by a committee consisting of EFA Board Members Katriel Schory (Israel) and Angela Bosch Ríus (Spain), director/screenwriter Paddy Breathnach (Ireland), festival programmer Markus Duffner (Germany/Italy) and distributor/festival programmer Selma Mehadžić (Croatia).

Best Director

Best Screenwriter

Best Actor

Best Actress

Documentary

Animated Feature 
The nominations were determined by a committee consisting of EFA Board Member EFA Board Member Béatrice Thiriet (France), director Anca Damian (Romania), producer Antonio Saura (Spain) and, representing CARTOON, the European Association of Animation Film, Diogo Carvalho (producer, Portugal), Camilla Deakin (producer, UK) and Norbert Laporte (institutional, Luxembourg).

Short Film

Critics Award

European Discovery - Prix FIPRESCI 
The nominees were announced on 8 October 2020. The nominations were determined by a committee composed of EFA Board Members Valérie Delpierre (Spain) and Anita Juka (Croatia), curator Giona A. Nazzaro (Italy) as well as film critics Marta Balaga (Finland/Poland), Andrei Plakhov (Russia) and Frédéric Ponsard (France), all three as representatives of FIPRESCI, the International Federation of Film Critics.

Audience awards

University Award
The European Film Academy and Filmfest Hamburg have announced five following movies as a European University Film Award (EUFA) nominee.

Technical awards
The winners for the Excellence Awards were presented on 9 December 2020.

Best Composer

Best Production Designer

Best Makeup and Hairstyling

Best Sound Designer

Best Cinematographer

Best Costume Designer

Best Editor

Best Visual Effects

References

External links 
 

2020 film awards
2020 in Europe
2020 in Germany
European Film Awards ceremonies